The 1921 Arkansas Razorbacks football team represented the University of Arkansas in the Southwest Conference (SWC) during the 1921 college football season. In their second and final year under head coach George McLaren, the Razorbacks compiled a 5–3–1 record (2–1 against SWC opponents), finished in third place in the SWC, and outscored their opponents by a combined total of 144 to 48.

Schedule

References

Arkansas
Arkansas Razorbacks football seasons
Arkansas Razorbacks football